Synoptic Optical Long-term Investigations of the Sun (SOLIS) is a synoptic facility for solar observations over a long time frame that is funded by the National Science Foundation (NSF) and designed and built by the National Solar Observatory (NSO).
It is operated by the NSO Integrated Synoptic Program (NISP).
SOLIS is a single set of three instruments mounted on a common observing platform. The instruments are the 50 cm aperture Vector Spectromagnetograph (VSM), the 8 mm aperture Integrated Sunlight Spectrometer (ISS), and the 14 cm aperture Full-Disk Patrol (FDP). The VSM telescope is a quasi-Ritchey-Chretien design with a primary mirror operating 
at f/1.6. The ~ 400 W of solar light from the primary is reflected by a secondary mirror fabricated from a 
single silicon crystal. The final f/6.6 full-disk solar image is focused on a spectrograph slit that is cooled 
by a flow of chilled water-propylene glycol solution. The mirrors are coated with protected silver. To improve the internal seeing, the VSM is sealed by 74 cm diameter, 6 mm thick fused silica window. Originally, it was filled with helium at about ambient pressure and temperature. In 2014, helium was replaced by nitrogen due to the increasing cost of helium. Due to this change, the image sharpness was slightly degraded.

The VSM provides full-disk vector (strength and direction) maps of the solar magnetic field both in the photosphere and in the chromosphere on a daily basis, continuing the 40-year record of NSO magnetic field observations. The ISS obtains spectra of the Sun integrated over the solar disk, so the Sun appears as it would as a much more distant star. The combination of data from the ISS and the VSM is useful for studies of exoplanet systems as it allows the modeling of the influence of a star's magnetic field on its spectrum giving clues to the activity level that the exoplanets may be subject to. The FDP provides full-disk images of the Sun in a variety of spectral lines with a cadence as high as 10 seconds. 

SOLIS was located on top of the Vacuum Telescope building
at Kitt Peak National Observatory until July 2014, then temporarily moved to the University of Arizona Agricultural Farm in Tucson until October 2017, and is now being permanently relocated to Big Bear Solar Observatory in California. Once back to operations, SOLIS will provide unique observations of the Sun on a continuing basis for several decades to understand the solar activity cycle, sudden energy releases in the solar atmosphere, and solar irradiance changes and their relationship to global change.

SOLIS Gallery

See also
 List of astronomical observatories

References

Solar telescopes
Solar observatories
Optical telescopes
Astronomical observatories in California
National Science Foundation